Orkla is a river in Trøndelag and Innlandet counties in Norway. At  in length, it is the longest river in Trøndelag county. The river follows the Orkdalen valley, discharging into the Orkdal Fjord, an arm of the large Trondheimsfjorden, at the town of Orkanger.

The river originates in the lake Orkelsjøen, a small lake near the watershed with the river Unna in the Glomma river system, in the municipality of Oppdal in the Dovrefjell mountains. The river runs through the municipalities of Oppdal, Tynset, Rennebu, and Orkland. The municipalities are all in Trøndelag county, except for Tynset, which is in Innlandet county. Major towns and villages along the river include: Orkanger, Fannrem, Vormstad, Svorkmo, Storås, Meldal, Å (in Orkland); and Voll and Berkåk (in Rennebu).

Orkla is a popular river for salmon fishing, and the fourth largest in Norway by volume.

The river is regulated by five power generation reservoirs, which were built between 1978 and 1985. The reservoirs have been a successful method of flood control preventing the river's major seasonal flooding. The decommissioned Eidsfossen Power Station stands along the river south of the confluence with the Ya River at Yset.

Name
The Old Norse form of the name was just Ork (still found in the names Orkanger, Orkdal, Orkland) and Orkelsjøen. The meaning of the name is unknown (maybe derived from the old norse verb orka which means "to work" - the meaning of the name would then be "the river that works its way forward"). The name Orkla (with the diminutive ending -la) originally belonged to the uppermost part of the river (lying in Tynset, Innlandet), and the meaning of this name is probably "the small part of Ork".

See also
List of rivers in Norway

References

Rivers of Trøndelag
Orkland
Rennebu
Tynset
Oppdal
Rivers of Norway